Aliya Farkhatovna Mustafina is a Russian former artistic gymnast. With a combined total of 45 Olympic, World and European Championship medals, she is considered one of the most successful gymnasts of all time. 

She is the 2010 all-around world champion, the 2013 European all around champion, the 2012 and 2016 Olympic uneven bars champion and a seven-time Olympic medalist. Mustafina has tied with Svetlana Khorkina for the most won by a Russian gymnast (not including Soviet Union women's national artistic gymnastics team). She was the ninth gymnast to win medals on every event at the World Championship. 

At the 2012 Summer Olympics, Mustafina won four medals, making her the most decorated gymnast of the competition and the most decorated athlete in any sport except swimming. At the 2016 Summer Olympics, she became the first female gymnast since Simona Amânar in 2000 to win an all-around medal in two consecutive Olympics, and the first since Svetlana Khorkina (also in 2000) to defend her title in an Olympic apparatus final.

Mustafina and Simone Biles are -most decorated Olympic Women’s artistic gymnast of the 21st century.

In February 2021 Mustafina was announced as the head coach of the Russian junior national team.

Early life
Mustafina was born in Yegoryevsk, Russia, on 30 September 1994. Her father, Farhat Mustafin, a Volga Tatar, was a bronze medalist in Greco-Roman wrestling at the 1976 Summer Olympics, and her mother, Yelena Kuznetsova, an ethnic Russian, is a physics teacher.

Junior career

2007 
Mustafina's first major international competition was the International Gymnix in Montreal in March 2007. She placed second in the all-around with a score of 58.825. The following month, she competed at the Stella Zakharova Cup in Kyiv and placed second in the all-around with a score of 55.150.

In September 2007, Mustafina competed at the Japan Junior International in Yokohama. She placed second in the all-around with a score of 59.800 and second in all four event finals, scoring 14.750 on vault, 15.250 on uneven bars, 15.450 on balance beam, and 14.100 on floor exercise.

2008
At the 2008 European Women's Artistic Gymnastics Championships in Clermont-Ferrand, France, Mustafina helped the Russian junior team finish in first place and won the silver medal in the individual all-around with a score of 60.300. In event finals, she placed fourth on uneven bars, scoring 14.475, and fourth on floor, scoring 14.375.

In November, she competed in the senior division at the Massilia Cup in Marseille. She placed sixth in the all-around with a score of 57.300; fourth on vault, scoring 13.950; and second on floor, scoring 14.925.

2009
Mustafina competed in the senior division at the Russian national championships in Bryansk in March, and won the all-around with a score of 58.550. She also placed second on uneven bars, scoring 15.300; first on balance beam, scoring 14.950; and third on floor, scoring 14.700. The new Russian head coach, Alexander Alexandrov, lamented the fact that "girls of that age cannot compete at senior international competitions".

She competed twice over the summer, placing second in the all-around (58.250) at the Japan Cup in Tokyo in July and winning the all-around (59.434) in the senior division at the Russian Cup in Penza in August. In December, she won the all-around at the Gymnasiade competition in Doha, Qatar, with a score of 57.350, and went on to place second on vault (13.900), first on uneven bars (14.825), first on balance beam (14.175), and first on floor (14.575).

Senior career

2010
Mustafina was injured during a training session in March and was unable to compete in the Russian national championships.

In April, she competed at an Artistic Gymnastics World Cup event in Paris. She placed fourth on uneven bars after an error, scoring 14.500, and second on balance beam, scoring 14.175. At the end of the month, she competed at the 2010 European Championships in Birmingham, where she contributed an all-around score of 58.175 toward the Russian team's first-place finish and placed second on uneven bars, scoring 15.050; second on balance beam, scoring 14.375; and eighth on floor, scoring 13.225.

At the Russian Cup in Chelyabinsk in August, Mustafina won the all-around competition with a score of 62.271. In event finals, she placed second on vault, scoring 13.963; first on uneven bars, scoring 14.775; third on balance beam, scoring 14.850; and first on floor, scoring 15.300.In October, she competed at the 2010 World Artistic Gymnastics Championships in Rotterdam and made history by qualifying for the all-around final and all four event finals—the first gymnast to do so since Shannon Miller and Svetlana Khorkina in 1996. She contributed an all-around score of 60.932 toward the Russian team's first-place finish and won the individual all-around with a score of 61.032. In event finals, she placed second on vault, scoring 15.066; second on uneven bars, scoring 15.600; seventh on balance beam, scoring 13.766 after a fall; and second on floor, scoring 14.766. She left Rotterdam with five medals, more than any other artistic gymnast, male or female. Andy Thornton wrote for Universal Sports:

In November, Mustafina competed in the Italian Grand Prix in Cagliari, Sardinia. She placed fourth on uneven bars, scoring 13.570, and first on balance beam, scoring 14.700.

2011

Mustafina competed at the American Cup in Jacksonville, Florida, in March. She finished in a controversial second to American Jordyn Wieber, with an all-around score of 59.831, after leading for three-quarters of the competition but falling on floor exercise, the last event. Later that month, she placed second on vault at a World Cup event in Paris, scoring 14.433; first on uneven bars, scoring 15.833; and first on balance beam, scoring 15.333.

In April, she competed at the 2011 European Championships in Berlin. She qualified to the all-around final in first place, with a score of 59.750, but tore her left anterior cruciate ligament while competing a 2.5 twisting Yurchenko vault in the final. Five days later, she had surgery in Straubing, Germany.

Mustafina's coaches had her resume workouts slowly. Coach Valentina Rodionenko said in May, "Only when we are told that she can proceed with training will we go forward. It's important to save her for the Olympic Games." By July, she was only doing upper body conditioning and rehabilitation on her leg. In August, after the Russian team was announced for the 2011 World Championships, Rodionenko said: "Aliya really wanted to go to Worlds—her heart and soul are literally crying, 'I can do it! I'm ready!' But we do not want to risk costing her the Olympics, and her surgeon in Germany said that she can start real training only in December. She just thinks she's ready now. But she does not really understand what she will face. She must be protected. Sometimes it takes years for people to recover from these injuries, and she hasn't even had five months."

In December, Mustafina returned to competition at the Voronin Cup in Moscow. She placed fourth in the all-around and second on uneven bars with a score of 15.475. Coach Alexander Alexandrov said, "I was pleasantly surprised and happy about her first meet. She didn't do her full routines and full difficulty, but she tried what she was ready for at the time, and for me, it was enough to see. She was nervous, even though her goal was just to compete, to see how she does after eight months off and how well she could handle the pressure and how her knee would feel. I came up to her and said, 'Well, it seems like you're not very nervous at all, and I'm surprised!' And she said, 'Look at my hands, Alexander', and her hands were shaking. 'Maybe I'm not showing that I'm nervous, but inside I have butterflies!'"

2012 
Mustafina competed at the Russian national championships in Penza in March at what Alexandrov said was "75 to 80 percent". She won the all-around with a score of 59.533 and uneven bars with a score of 16.220, and finished fifth on balance beam with a score of 13.680. In May, at the 2012 European Championships in Brussels, she contributed scores of 15.166 on vault, 15.833 on uneven bars, and 13.933 on floor toward the Russian team's second-place finish.

At the Russian Cup in Penza in June, she placed second in the all-around, behind Viktoria Komova, with a score of 59.167. In event finals, she placed first on uneven bars, scoring 16.150; second on balance beam, scoring 15.000; and first on floor, scoring 14.750.

London Olympics 

At the end of July, Mustafina competed at the 2012 Summer Olympics in London. She helped Russia to qualify to the team final in second place, and qualified to the individual all-around final in fifth place with a score of 59.966. She also qualified fifth for the uneven bars final, scoring 15.700, and eighth for the floor final, scoring 14.433.

In the team final, Mustafina contributed an all-around score of 60.266 toward the Russian team's second-place finish.

In the all-around final, she finished in third place with a score of 59.566. She earned the same score as American Aly Raisman, but after tie-breaking rules were applied, Mustafina was awarded the bronze medal.

Mustafina went on to win the uneven bars final with a score of 16.133, ending Russia's 12-year gold medal drought in Olympic gymnastics.

In the floor final, she placed third with a score of 14.900, earning the bronze medal in a tie-breaker over Italy's Vanessa Ferrari.

On 15 August, Russian President Vladimir Putin awarded Mustafina the Order of Friendship at a special ceremony at the Kremlin in Moscow. She was one of 33 Russian athletes to receive the award.

In December, she competed at the DTB Stuttgart World Cup, where the Russian team finished first.

2013
At the 2013 Russian national championships, Mustafina successfully defended her all-around title with a score of 59.850, earning a 15.450 on beam, 15.500 on bars, 13.600 on floor, and 15.300 on vault. These scores qualified her to the beam and uneven bars finals in first place, and to the floor exercise final in third place, but she withdrew from all but the bars final to protect her knee. She received a silver medal with the Moscow Central team and finished third in the uneven bars final, behind Anastasia Grishina (first) and Tatiana Nabieva (second).

Later, Mustafina won the all-around and team titles at the Stella Zakharova Cup. In event finals, she won gold on uneven bars and silver on balance beam after a fall on the latter.

At the 2013 European Championships in Moscow, she fell twice off the balance beam in qualifications and entered the all-around final in fourth place, with a score of 56.057. In the final, she scored 15.033 on vault, 15.133 on uneven bars, 14.400 on balance beam, and 14.466 on floor, winning the all-around title—her first individual European title—with a total of 59.032. The next day, she won the uneven bars final with a score of 15.300. She also qualified to the floor exercise final in third place, but withdrew and gave her spot to Grishina, who had been left out of the final due to the limit of two gymnasts per country.

In July, Mustafina competed at the 2013 Summer Universiade in Kazan, Russia, alongside teammates Nabieva, Ksenia Afanasyeva, Maria Paseka, and Anna Dementyeva. Before the competition, her participation had been in question after she was hospitalized for flu. In the team competition, which also served as a qualification round for the individual finals, Mustafina contributed scores of 13.750 on floor, 14.950 on vault, 15.000 on uneven bars, and 15.200 on beam toward Russia's first-place finish. She qualified to the all-around final as well as the uneven bars, balance beam, and floor finals. In the all-around final, she won the title with a score of 57.900. Individually, she won gold on bars and silver on beam. In the floor final, she fell on her last tumbling pass and finished 9th.

In October, just after turning 19, Mustafina competed at the 2013 World Artistic Gymnastics Championships in Antwerp. Prior to the competition, she had been sick for weeks and had been experiencing knee pain. In qualifications, she fell on her first tumbling pass on floor (two whips into a double Arabian) and crashed her second vault (round-off, half-on, full twist off), causing her to miss the finals in both events. However, she still qualified fifth for the all-around final with a score of 57.165, fifth for uneven bars, and eighth for balance beam. In the all-around final, she finished third with a total of 58.856 (14.891 on vault, 15.233 on uneven bars, 14.166 on balance beam, and 14.566 on floor), behind Simone Biles and Kyla Ross of the United States. In the uneven bars final, she scored 15.033 and finished in third place, behind Huang Huidan and Ross. She went on to win her first world beam title with a score of 14.900, ahead of Ross and Biles.

In her last competition of 2013, Mustafina helped her team finish second at the Stuttgart World Cup, competing only on balance beam.

2014
On 3 April, Mustafina successfully defended her Russian national all-around title, scoring 14.733 for a double-twisting Yurchenko vault, 14.333 on uneven bars, 15.400 on balance beam, and 15.100 on floor exercise.

In May, she competed at the 2014 European Championships in Sofia, Bulgaria. Hampered by an ankle injury, she performed on only two events in qualifications: uneven bars and balance beam. She qualified to both finals, with scores of 15.100 and 14.233, respectively. In the team final, she scored 14.700 on vault, 15.166 on bars, and 14.800 on beam, leading an inexperienced Russian team to a third-place finish behind Romania and Great Britain, which took gold and silver, respectively. In event finals, she placed second on the uneven bars with a score of 15.266, and third on balance beam with a score of 14.733.

At the Russian Cup in Penza in August, Mustafina represented Moscow alongside Paseka, Alla Sosnitskaya, and Daria Spiridonova, and they easily won the team title by five points over silver medalist Saint Petersburg. Individually, Mustafina won the all-around with a total score of 59.133. In the event finals, she won beam with a score of 15.567 and floor with a score of 14.700, and placed second on the uneven bars with a score of 15.267. At the end of the meet, she was selected—along with Paseka, Sosnitskaya, Spiridonova, Maria Kharenkova, and Ekaterina Kramarenko—to represent Russia at the 2014 World Championships in Nanning, China.

In the qualifying round at the World Championships, Mustafina scored 14.900 on vault, 15.166 on bars, 14.308 on beam, and 14.500 on floor, for a total of a 58.874. She qualified second to the all-around final, fourth on bars, seventh on beam, and fifth on floor. Russia qualified to the team final in third place, behind the United States and China. In the team final, Mustafina contributed a 15.133 on vault, 15.066 on bars, 14.766 on beam, and 14.033 on floor to Russia's third-place finish. In the all-around final, she finished fourth with a total score of 57.915, performing well on vault and bars but making mistakes on beam and floor. She would later state that a fever was the cause of her poor performance. In the uneven bars final, she finished in sixth place with a score of 15.100. She then won bronze medals in the balance beam and floor exercise finals, scoring 14.166 on beam and 14.733 on floor to beat out Asuka Teramoto of Japan and MyKayla Skinner of the United States. This made her the ninth-most decorated female artistic gymnast at the World Championships, with a total of 11 medals.

At the Stuttgart World Cup in late 2014, Mustafina fell on uneven bars and balance beam and made several errors on floor exercise, causing her to finish fifth. In December, after competing for two seasons without a coach, she began working with Sergei Starkin, who coached world champion Denis Ablyazin.

2015

In order to recover from injuries and stress, Mustafina did not compete at the 2015 Russian Championships or the 2015 European Championships. She returned to competition at the 2015 European Games in Baku in June with Viktoria Komova and Seda Tutkhalyan. They won the team final, and in the individual all-around final, Mustafina again placed first with a score of 58.566. She also received a gold medal on bars (15.400) and silver on floor (14.200, her best score of the competition on that apparatus).

On 18 September, Mustafina announced that she was withdrawing from the World Championships in Glasgow due to back pain.

2016
At the end of March, Mustafina was reportedly hospitalized for back pain. On 6 April, she returned to competition at the Russian Championships in Penza. In the first round, she performed watered-down routines on bars and beam, which scored 15.333 and 14.400 respectively. Next day in the team final, she scored 15.300 on bars and 14.133 on beam, helping her team to a silver. In the event finals, she won bronze on bars and beam, scoring 15.200 and 14.800 respectively.

At the European Championships in Bern in June, she qualified first to the uneven bars and balance beam finals, scoring 15.166 and 14.733, respectively. She also performed a downgraded floor routine, for which she scored 13.533. In the team final, she received a 15.333 on bars, 14.800 on beam, and 13.466 on floor. Russia won the gold with a team total of 175.212, five points ahead of the second-place British team. In the uneven bars final, Mustafina won a bronze medal with a score of 15.100, followed by a gold medal on beam with a 15.100: her fifth European title and 12th medal.

Her next appearance was at the Russian Cup. In qualifying, she placed fifth after failing to perform an acrobatic series on beam and falling twice on the uneven bars. In the all-around final, she placed third, with one fall on bars. This was her first all-around competition since the 2015 European Games, which she won. Despite withdrawing from event finals to work with a physiotherapist in Moscow, she was named to the Olympic team for Russia along with first-year senior and Russian Cup champion Angelina Melnikova, 2015 World Championships team member Tutkhalyan, and 2015 world champions Paseka and Spiridonova.

Rio Olympics 

At the 2016 Summer Olympics in Rio de Janeiro, Mustafina qualified to the all-around final with a total of 58.098, despite a fall on the balance beam. She also qualified in second place to the uneven bars final with a score of 15.833, and scored 15.166 on vault and 14.066 on floor. Russia qualified to the team final in third place, behind the United States and China.

In the team final on 9 August, Mustafina helped Russia win a silver medal behind the US, with a total team score of 176.688. Mustafina contributed a 15.133 on vault, 15.933 on bars, 14.958 on beam, and 14.000 on floor.

Two days later, Mustafina competed in the individual all-around final and scored 58.665 (15.200 on vault, 15.666 on uneven bars, 13.866 on balance beam, and 13.933 on floor). She placed third behind Americans Simone Biles and Aly Raisman, repeating her bronze-medal performance from the 2012 Olympics. On 14 August, Mustafina competed in the individual uneven bars final. She defended her 2012 title and scored a 15.900, winning the gold medal ahead of American silver medallist Madison Kocian and bronze medallist Sophie Scheder of Germany.

2017
Mustafina returned to training in 2017 after the birth of her daughter, Alisa, with the hope of returning to competition for the 2018 European Championships and eventually the 2020 Tokyo Olympics.

2018
Mustafina participated in the Palais des Gym showcase event in February along with former Olympic teammate Angelina Melnikova. On bars, she performed to the song New Rules by Dua Lipa, showing a Pak+Maloney combo, toe on 1/1, and a tucked full-in dismount among other skills. On beam, she performed several leaps with an aerial walkover, back handspring, and her signature Onodi.

In April, Mustafina competed for the first time in a year and a half at the Russian National Championships in Kazan, Russia. On the first day of competition, she earned a gold medal with the Moscow team and qualified to the all-around, uneven bars, balance beam, and floor exercise finals. Two days later, after crashing her 1.5 Yurchenko and scoring a 12.433 on vault, 14.966 on bars, 12.533 on beam, and 13.066 on floor, she placed fourth in the all-around behind Angelina Melnikova, first-year senior Angelina Simakova, and Viktoria Komova. She later placed sixth in the bars final, fourth in the beam final, and withdrew from the floor final.

In May, Mustafina was scheduled to compete at the Osijek Challenge Cup but withdrew from the competition because of a minor meniscus injury.  In late June, Mustafina was slated to compete at the Russian Cup but withdrew because of the same knee injury.

On September 29, Mustafina was named on the nominative team to compete at the 2018 World Championships in Doha, Qatar alongside Lilia Akhaimova, Irina Alexeeva, Melnikova, and Simakova. On October 17, the Worlds team was officially announced and was unchanged from the nominative team.  During qualifications Mustafina was originally only planning to compete on balance beam and uneven bars, but due to an ankle injury for Simakova she also competed on floor exercise.  She qualified for the uneven bars final in sixth place and Russia qualified to the team final in second place.

In the team final on 30 October, Mustafina helped Russia win a silver medal behind the US, with a total team score of 162.863. Mustafina contributed a 14.5 on bars (the second highest score of the day on bars), 13.266 on beam, and 13.066 on floor.

2019
In January it was announced that Mustafina would compete at the Stuttgart World Cup in early March.  It was the first time she competed in the all-around in international competition since the Rio Olympics.  In March, at the Russian National Championships, Mustafina finished third in the all-around behind Angelina Simakova and Angelina Melnikova.  At the Stuttgart World Cup Mustafina finished in fifth place after falling off the balance beam.  The following week Mustafina competed at the Birmingham World Cup where she finished first despite falling off the balance beam.  After a winning in Birmingham, Mustafina was named to the team to compete at the 2019 European Championships, replacing national champion Simakova who had inconsistent performances in Stuttgart earlier in the month.  In April it was announced that Mustafina had withdrawn from the European Championships team in order to focus on preparing for the European Games in June.

In May Mustafina was officially named to the team to compete at the European Games alongside Angelina Melnikova and Aleksandra Shchekoldina.  In June Mustafina withdrew from the European Games due to a partial ligament tear in her ankle.

In July, Mustafina trained in Tokyo alongside the rest of the Russian national team, including Juniors Vladislava Urazova and Elena Gerasimova, in preparation for the 2020 Tokyo Olympics.  In August Mustafina withdrew from the Russian Cup, but did not cite her reason for doing so.  While in attendance at the Russian Cup, Mustafina announced that she would not be competing at the 2019 World Championships, opting to physically and mentally rest and start the 2020 season with "a brand new energy".

2021
Mustafina officially announced her retirement from the sport on June 8, 2021, at the Russian Cup.

Coaching career 
In 2021 Mustafina began working as a coach for the junior national team.  In February she was announced as the acting head coach of the junior national team.

Influences 
When asked about being compared to Khorkina following her success at the 2010 World Championships, Mustafina said, "I have no idols and never have. Svetlana was, of course, an amazing gymnast."

In response to a question about her gymnastics role models, Mustafina praised Nastia Liukin's "elegant and beautiful performances with difficult elements" and Ksenia Afanasyeva's "strong and beautiful gymnastics".

Personal life
Mustafina began dating Russian bobsledder Alexey Zaitsev in autumn 2015. They met at a hospital where both were recovering from sports injuries. They married on 3 November 2016 in his hometown of Krasnodar.

In January 2017, it was reported that Mustafina was pregnant and that the baby was due in July. Mustafina gave birth to her daughter, Alisa, on 9 June 2017. She was reported to have divorced her husband in April 2018.

Skills

Selected competitive skills

Eponymous skills
Mustafina has two eponymous skills listed in the Code of Points.

Competitive history

International scores

See also

List of multiple Olympic medalists at a single Games
List of Olympic female gymnasts for Russia
List of Olympic medal leaders in women's gymnastics
List of top female medalists at the World Artistic Gymnastics Championships

References

External links 

 
 
 
  
 

1994 births
Living people
People from Yegoryevsk
Russian female artistic gymnasts
Gymnasts at the 2012 Summer Olympics
Gymnasts at the 2016 Summer Olympics
Olympic gymnasts of Russia
Olympic gold medalists for Russia
Olympic silver medalists for Russia
Olympic bronze medalists for Russia
Olympic medalists in gymnastics
Medalists at the 2012 Summer Olympics
Medalists at the 2016 Summer Olympics
World champion gymnasts
Medalists at the World Artistic Gymnastics Championships
Gymnasts at the 2015 European Games
European Games medalists in gymnastics
European Games gold medalists for Russia
European Games silver medalists for Russia
European champions in gymnastics
Originators of elements in artistic gymnastics
Universiade medalists in gymnastics
Tatar people of Russia
Universiade gold medalists for Russia
Universiade silver medalists for Russia
Medalists at the 2013 Summer Universiade
Sportspeople from Moscow Oblast